The Hundred of Cotton is a hundred in the County of Chandos, South Australia, established in 1894.

History

The traditional owners of the land are the Ngargad Australian Aboriginal tribes. The explorer Edward Eyre passed through the area during his 1940-1841 travels.

The towns of Kalkam, Parrakie and Mulpata are within the hundred.

See also
 Lands administrative divisions of South Australia

References

Cotton